Nurieux station (French: Gare de Nurieux) is a French railway station located in the commune of Nurieux-Volognat, Ain department in the Auvergne-Rhône-Alpes region. Established at an elevation of 484 meters, the station is located at kilometric point (KP) 33.468 on the Ligne du Haut-Bugey, between the stations of Cize—Bolozon and Brion—Montréal-la-Cluse.

History 
In 2019, the SNCF estimated that 20,701 passengers traveled through the station.

Services

Passenger services

Train services

Intermodality

See also 

 List of SNCF stations in Auvergne-Rhône-Alpes
 List of TGV stations

References 

TER Auvergne-Rhône-Alpes
Railway stations in Ain
Railway stations in France opened in 1877